The People's Orchestra (TPO) is a community-based non-profit orchestra based in West Bromwich Town Hall, England.

Established in 2012 by Sarah Marshall, The People's Orchestra plays a variety of concerts, predominantly in Birmingham and West Bromwich, featuring music from film, TV and other not so traditional sources such as video games. TPO is a 'diverse mix' of talented musicians of all ages who come together as a full orchestra or in smaller groups to create and perform across the Midlands. The only requirement to become part of the orchestra is that players have to have played towards Grade 7, and must have good sight-reading of music. As an independent charity it has also developed a volunteer programme called TPO Bridge, which helps local unemployed people back into work.

Subsidiary groups
The People's Orchestra has gone on to develop The Rusty Players Orchestra, for musicians looking to resume playing their instruments, and a virtual orchestral performance created from membership instrument recordings called Sofa Symphonies, which launched in 2020. There are two branches of this orchestra, in South Birmingham and Carmarthen, with a third due to start in Barry in September 2022.

In 2019 TPO also launched The People's Show Choir, encompassing a number of choirs performing film, show and light popular music across The Midlands. Choir locations include Birmingham, West Bromwich, Oswestry, Northampton, Stoke-on-Trent, Moseley and Cheltenham.

The People's Orchestra launched the Sing From Your Sofa project, encouraging choir members to continue rehearsing and creating virtual performances form home.

The Peoples Orchestra has also started The People's Big Band. This is a group dedicated to reinventing the modern with the crisp jazzy sounds of the 40s. So far, the only branch for this group is in Birmingham.

TPO also runs a Sing Together Workshop programme, encouraging care and residential home members and staff to have fun with singing.

Concert History

2012-2015
The People's Orchestra's first concert, titled 'trailers' was held at the Adrian Boult Hall in Birmingham on 4 November 2012. The concert was compered by Les Ross and contained film music and light popular music. Their anniversary concert was performed on 24 March 2013 at The Public in West Bromwich, where the programme included both classical and modern-day film music.

The People's Orchestra produced their 'Sporting Classics' concert on 8 June 2013 at The Public, performing music including The Chain by Fleetwood Mac, Ravel's Bolero and Pop looks Bach.<ref>The People's Orchestra www.livebrum.co.uk', accessed 3 December 2021</ref>  Their War themed concert was held on 21 September 2013 and included music from Dambusters, Saving Private Ryan, Star Wars and The Great Escape. The first TPO Christmas Concerts – Christmas Music by Candlelight and The Snowman, were held at the Malvern Forum Theatre on 8 December 2013, where the orchestra performed both Christmas Carols and The Snowman live to film.

In 2014, The People's Orchestra began their concert series with 'The Love Concert', held in Lichfield Guild Hall and including music from Dirty Dancing, Beauty and the Beast, Moulin Rouge and West Side Story. This was followed by a 2nd Birthday Concert on 6 April 2014 at West Bromwich Town Hall.The People’s Orchestra – 2nd Birthday www.scvo.info On 22 July 2014, The People's Orchestra launched their film greats concert series in the Adrian Boult Hall in Birmingham. Conducted by Christopher Evans, music included highlights from Harry Potter, Lord of the Rings and Warhorse. This concert also launched the world premier of ‘Flight of the Pegasus’, a new composition created by professional composer John Koutselinis.Film Greats by The People's Orchestra www.weekendnotes.co.uk, accessed 5 December 2021

The People's Orchestra also featured on stage at the Pride of Birmingham Awards, held at Birmingham Town Hall in 2014.

In October 2014 at West Bromwich Town Hall, The People's Orchestra produced their 'Fright Night Halloween Special concert', conducted by John Brennan. The repertoire included Corpse Bride and Phantom of the Opera....The West Midlands Pro-Am Orchestra, The People’s Orchestra, will be presenting 'Fright Night'... www.livebrum.co.uk, accessed 5 December 2021 Something Magical: Far Far Away saw The People's Orchestra's next instalment of Christmas music in December 2014. With an animation theme, music included highlights from Frozen, Alice in Wonderland, Brave and The Little Mermaid. (archived 5 August 2020)

The first concert of 2015 for TPO, 'There and Back Again', was created to show the greatest hits of the orchestra since its inception. It was followed by the concert Out of This World, a sci fi themed concert with music from Treasure Planet, ET, Back to the Future and Apollo 13. This concert was conducted by Dan Watson. On 11 June 2015, The People's Orchestra featured on Stage alongside guest speakers for TEDx Birmingham, held at Birmingham Town Hall. In the same month The People's Orchestra also held their first Midsummer Night's Ball, to feature dancing, dinner and music in The Great Hall at the University of Birmingham. Music included songs from Glenn Miller, Riverdance, Sleeping Beauty and other light popular music. The People's Orchestra also launched multiple Christmas Concerts in 2015, spanning over a week in December. Christmas Music and Majesty, as well as Something Magical, were produced in multiple locations and detailed Christmas Carols and Film Scores.
 
In August 2015, The People's Orchestra had the opportunity to work with the renowned composer and saxophonist John Altman.

2016-2020
2016 saw the first concert in the 'Legends' series, specifically spanning Superhero Symphonies. Conducted by Dan Watson, music included themes from Spiderman, Batman, Thor, Iron Man and Superman. The 4th Birthday concert titled ‘Saturday Night at the Movies’, showcased music from James Bond, The Magnificent Seven and Transformers, as well as world premiere of a new tailored composition called ‘All at C’, created and performed alongside John Altman.The People’s Orchestra’s Fourth Birthday Concert, March 29, 2016, Mazeline Hemmings www.scvo.info

The orchestra became better known after participating in BBC4 & BBC2's All Together Now: The Great Orchestra Challenge, managing to finish fourth. During the course of the programme they got the chance to showcase their musical skills at the Maida Vale Studios and the Bridgewater Hall in Manchester.

The 5th Birthday Concert titled 'Songs from the Shows' was performed on 1 April 2017 at West Bromwich Town Hall, including themes from Evita, Mary Poppins, Chicago and Les Misérables. This was followed by and On the Battlefield Concert on 3 July at the same venue. The People's Orchestra also collaborated on the performance titled The Greatest Concert of All, conducted by Rob Spalton, at the Walsall Arboretum. 
In 2017, film composer John Koutselinis collaborated with The People's Orchestra for the music piece 'Beyond the Skies', which was written specifically for the orchestra, and the end credits from a film by K&K productions titled 'Cable: The Chronicles of Hope', performed at the New Alexandra Theatre for the concert 'Legends: Superhero Symphonies'.TPO Presents Legends – Superhero Symphonies July 22  www.discoversandwell.co.ukThe Peoples Orchestra Presents Legends: Superhero Symphonies livebrum.co.uk

Fantastic Beats[sic] and Where to Find Them was a concert produced on 14 October 2017, including highlights from Harry Potter and Fantastic Beasts and Where to Find Them. TPO's 6th Birthday concert was founded in tribute to the scores of Micheal Giacchino, and included music from Star Trek, A Star Wars Story and Ratatouille.

Pete Cater has participated within the percussion section at TPO concerts. Cater has been named in the top 8 jazz drummers in the world by Rhythm magazine's Poll.

The People's Orchestra constructed a flash mob in collaboration with Virgin Trains, held during transit from London Euston to Birmingham. Their second flash mob was organised at the NEC during a Yogscast Panel Event, to perform the theme Diggy Diggy Hole.

TPO has organised and begun an exchange tour programme with Orchestre Philharmonia Mundi de Montréal (OPMM) in Canada. The orchestra performed live at the 2019 handover ceremony for the Commonwealth Games, then anticipated to be held in Birmingham in 2020.

Also, TPO put on a their Superhero Symphonies concert in September 2019, followed by their Film Greats Christmas concert that same year.

2020 onwards
During 2022, The Peoples Orchestra has been running the Commonwealth Community Music Initiative, known as CCMI. This is a programme which offers opportunity to musicians from all corners of the Commonwealth, an initiative with the intent to showcase the immense talents of such a diverse community. It includes a composition contest, with winning pieces to be showcased during the Gala Curiosity Concert in July.

TPO concerts in 2022 include Heroes and Villains in May, a Curiosity Concert (immediately preceding the Commonwealth  games in Birmingham) in July followed by their Fright Night concert in October and a Circus Christmas'' concert in December.

Management

Sarah Marshall

Sarah Marshall has been the Artistic and Managing Director of The People's Orchestra since she created the orchestra back in 2012; the orchestra has over 60 members.

References

External links 
 TPO web site

Organisations based in the West Midlands (county)
English orchestras